English singer and songwriter Florrie has released four extended plays (EPs), twenty singles and fifteen music videos.

Florrie released her debut EP, Introduction, in November 2010 through iTunes Store, containing the tracks "Call of the Wild", "Give Me Your Love", "Summer Nights" and "Left Too Late". The EP was made available for free download on her official website, as well as on 12" vinyl pressings limited to 500 copies. Her second EP, Experiments, was released in June 2011 and included the singles "I Took a Little Something" and "Begging Me". The lead single "Begging Me" was released in April 2011. The music video for the second single, "I Took a Little Something", was a collaboration with fashion house Dolce & Gabbana.

Her third EP, Late, was released in May 2012. Florrie announced on her website the same month that she would sign to a major record label, thus making this EP her final release as an independent artist; this label was later reported as being Sony Music. Florrie released her fourth EP, Sirens, in April 2014, with music videos accompanying three of the tracks. A single, "Little White Lies", followed in August 2014.

Extended plays

Introduction

Introduction is the first EP by Florrie. It was released on 15 November 2010 as free download on her official site. It's available also on iTunes. The EP consists of four songs produced by Xenomania. It was preceded by the release of Florrie's debut single "Call 911", back in 2010, as a remix by Fred Falke. Other songs that preceded the release of the extended play were "Panic Attack", "Fascinate Me", "Come Back to Mine", all of them released as remixes, like the case of "Call 911", which original version is still unreleased.

Florrie released a music video for the song "Give Me Your Love". The video consists of Florrie and a backing band performing the song. The audio track of the video is the studio version of the song.

Experiments

Experiments is the second EP by Florrie. It was released on 14 June 2011 as download on iTunes. The EP consists of six songs produced by Xenomania.

There were made music videos for the songs "Begging Me", "I Took a Little Something" and "Experimenting with Rugs".

In a review of the EP, The Guardian wrote, "Thankfully, Florrie has the songs to make this way of working pay, having collaborated with Xenomania, MNEK, Fred Falke and Mike Chapman of Parallel Lines to create some sparkling pop moments".

Late

Late is the third EP by Florrie. It was released as download on iTunes on 31 May 2012. The EP consists of four songs produced by Xenomania.

Florrie released a music video for the song "Shot You Down".

Notable Dance magazine reviewed this EP and mentioned that "at only 4 songs, 100% of the content of the Late EP is fantastic, but after 16 minutes, it's over. So while the Late EP is extremely notable, the length is disappointing, especially following Experiments, a 6-track EP".

Sirens

Sirens is the fourth EP by Florrie, released by Sony Music on iTunes on 27 April 2014. The EP consists of 3 new songs and 2 remixes, one being a song included on the EP and the other an unreleased song ("Little White Lies") which would later be released as the first single from Florrie's debut album.

Music videos accompanying each of the three new songs were released through Florrie's YouTube account leading up to the digital release of the EP. Two videos, "Free Falling" and "Wanna Control Myself" (which featured British model Calum Ball), were directed by Jack Bowden, and the other one, "Seashells", by Ferry Gouw.

The EP shows somewhat of a departure from Florrie's previously pop and dance oriented music, featuring more loosely structured songs and widely incorporating spoken word lyrics. According to Florrie, a purpose of the EP's release was to generate buzz before the release of her debut album later in the year.

Singles

Music videos

Other appearances

With Capulets

References

External links

Discographies of British artists
Pop music discographies